The eastern white-eared giant rat (Hyomys goliath) is a species of rodent in the family Muridae.
It is found only in Papua New Guinea.

The species has been known to eat karuka nuts (Pandanus julianettii), and growers will put platforms or other obstacles on the trunks of the trees to keep the pests out.

Names
It is known as mumuk in the Kalam language of Papua New Guinea.

References

Hyomys
Rodents of Papua New Guinea
Mammals described in 1900
Taxonomy articles created by Polbot
Taxa named by Alphonse Milne-Edwards